Mohammed Flayfel (1899–1986) was a Lebanese composer and musician. 

Born in 1899 in the Ashrafiyeh neighborhood of Beirut, some of his notable compositions include "Mawtini" (the national anthem of Iraq and former national anthem of Palestine until 1996). His "Homat el Diyar" was selected in a 1938 competition as the national anthem of Syria. He also worked on several other patriotic songs, occasionally in collaboration with his brother, Ahmad Salim Flayfel. 

Mohammed Flayfel is also credited for discovering the talents of a young Fairuz when she participated in a radio talent show and advising her to enroll in the Lebanese Conservatory.  

He died in 1986.

References

1899 births
Lebanese composers
1986 deaths
National anthem writers